Leopold Mikolasch (17 October 1920 – 12 March 1964) was an Austrian footballer. He competed in the men's tournament at the 1948 Summer Olympics.

References

External links

1920 births
1964 deaths
Austrian footballers
Austria international footballers
Olympic footballers of Austria
Footballers at the 1948 Summer Olympics
Place of birth missing
Association football midfielders
FK Austria Wien players